The Constitutional Court of Slovakia (officially Constitutional Court of the Slovak Republic) is a special court established by the Constitution of Slovakia. Its seat is in Košice in eastern Slovakia. Its head is Ivan Fiačan (since 2019).

Tasks
The basic standing of the Court and its judges is regulated by the Constitution (more precisely, chapter seven, part one). It rules on the compatibility of laws, decrees (either by government or local administration bodies) and legal regulations (issued by local state administration or resulting from international treaties) with the Constitution. It also decides on disputes between bodies of state administration, unless if the law specifies that these disputes are decided by another state body, complaints against legally valid decisions of state bodies, elections, referendums etc., and is the only court that can sue the President of Slovakia.

The court initiates proceedings on the basis of proposal by: at least one-fifth (i.e. 30) deputies of the National Council of the Slovak Republic, the President of Slovakia, the Government of Slovakia, a court, the general prosecutor or anyone in the case of constitutional complaints.

Judges
Originally, the Court had ten judges appointed for seven years by the President, who selects them from the double number of candidates chosen by the National Council.

After a constitutional amendment in 2001, it is composed of thirteen judges appointed for twelve years, again selected by the President from the double number of candidates elected by the National Council (by a simple majority vote).

A candidate for constitutional judge must be electable to the National Council, be at least 40 years old, be a law school graduate and be practising law for at least 15 years. Judges may be taken into custody only with consent of the Constitutional Court.

References

External links
Official site

Slovakia
Law of Slovakia